Tomi Kostadinov (born 15 March 1991) is a Bulgarian footballer who plays as a midfielder for Vitosha Bistritsa.

Career
In July 2014, Kostadinov moved to Azerbaijan Premier League team AZAL, before having his contract terminated by mutual consent in January 2015, and signing for PFC Minyor Pernik. In the summer of 2015, he signed with Vitosha Bistritsa in the third division of Bulgarian football.

Career statistics

Club

Personal life
Kostadinov is religious and observes Saturday rather than Sunday as a non-working day (he does not train or participate in matches held on Saturdays).

References

External links

1991 births
Living people
Bulgarian footballers
First Professional Football League (Bulgaria) players
Association football midfielders
PFC CSKA Sofia players
OFC Bdin Vidin players
FC Chavdar Etropole players
PFC Litex Lovech players
PFC Minyor Pernik players
FC Vitosha Bistritsa players
FC Sportist Svoge players
Expatriate footballers in Greece
Expatriate footballers in Azerbaijan
Bulgarian expatriate sportspeople in Azerbaijan